The People Journalism Prize for Africa (PJPA) is a public service journalism award that recognizes outstanding journalists and citizen reporters in Africa, whose work have resulted in positive change and impact in the society. PJPA was created in 2020 with an inaugural endowment of US $3000 from the founders, Gatefield, a sub-saharan Africa based public strategy and media group. The inaugural edition of the award was received by investigative journalists, Kiki Mordi and Fisayo Soyombo in February 2020.

Inaugural event 
The 2019 PJPA award was held in Abuja on February 20, 2020, World Social Justice Day, in line with the vision of the initiative, which is to defend social justice through promoting independent journalism and free media. The award ceremony had a lineup of speakers including the country heads of the UN Women, Open Society Initiative for West Africa among others. The UN took advantage of the event to advocate for the passage of the sexual harassment bill, while the first joint winner, Fisayo, announced the donation of his funds to a non-profit that champions criminal justice reforms. During the event, a social justice advocate, Segun Awosanya, was presented with the 2019 People Champion award.

Judges 
The winners of the PJPA award are judged by the following persons who serve on the board of the Gatefield Impact Foundation.

 Adewunmi Emoruwa, Lead Strategist at Gatefield
 Eromo Egbejule, award-winning journalist and Africa Editor, OZY.com
 Mercy Abang, an award-winning journalist
 Saadatu Hamu Aliyu, Curator at the World Economic Forums Abuja Global Shapers Hub

Recipients

References 

Nigerian awards